The second season of Teenage Mutant Ninja Turtles aired on Nickelodeon from October 12, 2013, to September 26, 2014.

Plot
The second season takes off right after the first season. During a skirmish with the Kraang, April's father is accidentally mutated, causing a fracture between her and the turtles. this season also introduces Casey Jones, who becomes friend with April and also develops a crush on her while she is away from the turtles, she eventually forgives the turtles and Casey becomes friends with them, and they are also able to save her father.

From Japan, Shredder brings Tiger Claw with him, an assassin that becomes Shredder's second in command, Splinter reveals to the turtles that Karai is his daughter, she eventually learns the truth but is captured by the Shredder. In an effort to bait the turtles and Splinter, Shredder takes Karai hostage and threats to mutate her, while he wishes to mutate the turtles into snakes but Karai is mutated instead, but is able to return herself to human form at will.

At the end of the season, Shredder enters an alliance with the Kraang to find Karai and destroy the turtles in return of helping them take over New York, Kraang Subprime, the Kraang's master spy who has been posing as Irma, April's best friend, discovers turtles lair and the invasion begins, Shredder defeats Splinter, Leo is wounded by the Foot Clan, and all of people of New York are mutated into human-Kraang hybrids. Defeated, the turtles along with April and Casey escape New York and take shelter in O'Neil's farmhouse upstate.

Production
On October 2, 2012, Nickelodeon ordered a second season of Teenage Mutant Ninja Turtles.

Executive producer Ciro Nieli confirmed that Mutagen Man will have a large role in the second season and an hour-long episode featuring the voice actors of the original TMNT series (Cam Clarke, Townsend Coleman, Barry Gordon, and Rob Paulsen) in their respective roles for a cameo.

Corey Feldman (who was the voice of Donatello from the first and third entries of the original film series) was confirmed to play the role of Slash. Recurring franchise character Casey Jones was confirmed to appear in the second season of the series, where he is voiced by Josh Peck.

Jason Biggs departed the role of Leonardo after the 19th episode of season 2 and was temporarily replaced by Dominic Catrambone. Seth Green assumed the role beginning in season 3.

Episodes

See also
 2014 in television

References

2
2013 American television seasons
2014 American television seasons
Crossover animation
Crossover science fiction television episodes
Television episodes about alien invasion